Willis J. Rementer  (March 14, 1878 – September 23, 1922) was a Major League Baseball catcher for the Philadelphia Phillies.

Sources

Major League Baseball catchers
Philadelphia Phillies players
Baseball players from Pennsylvania
1878 births
1922 deaths
Holyoke Paperweights players
Lancaster Red Roses players
Memphis Turtles players
York White Roses players
Atlantic City Lanks players